Orienteering at the 2017 Summer Deaflympics in Samsun, Turkey took place at five venues: Tekkekoy, City center, Bayraktepe, Kocadag, Kabadüz and Yenikoy.'''

Medal summary

Medalists

Men's events

Women's events

Mixed events

References

External links
 Orienteering

2017 Summer Deaflympics